Linda Gornall (born 21 March 1964) is an English former cyclist. Gornall competed in the women's road race event at the 1984 Summer Olympics.

She represented England in the road race, at the 1990 Commonwealth Games in Auckland, New Zealand.

Her brother Alan Gornall was also an England international cyclist.

References

External links
 

1964 births
Living people
English female cyclists
Olympic cyclists of Great Britain
Cyclists at the 1984 Summer Olympics
Sportspeople from Preston, Lancashire
Cyclists at the 1990 Commonwealth Games
Commonwealth Games competitors for England